This is part of a list of Statutes of New Zealand for the period of the Liberal–Reform coalition Government of New Zealand up to and including part of the first year of the First Labour Government of New Zealand.

1930s

1932  

 Auckland Transport Board Empowering Act 
 Carterton and District Memorial Square Act 
 Local Authorities Interest Reduction and Loans Conversion Act  Amended: 1933/34
 Local Authorities' Sinking Funds Act 
 Mortgagors and Tenants Further Relief Act 
 Mortgagors and Tenants Relief Act  Amended: 1932
 Municipal Association Act  Amended: 1956/67/73/76/80
 National Expenditure Adjustment Act  Amended: 1932/60/63
 New Zealand Debt Conversion Act 
 Ohai Railway Board Act  Amended: 1934/35/38/43/47/71/73/75
 Okarito Harbour Act 
 Public Safety Conservation Act  Amended: 1960
 Sales Tax Act  Amended: 1933/68/74/85/86
 Thames Borough Commissioner Act  Amended: 1934/37/40
 Thames Harbour Board Loans Adjustment Act 
 Urban Farm Land Rating Act  Amended: 1935/55
 Waitangi Endowment Act 
 Waitangi National Trust Board Act  Amended: 1958/68/79/82
Plus 28 Acts amended

1933  

 Auckland Metropolitan Milk Act  Amended: 1935
 Bay of Plenty Licensing Committee Enabling Act 
 Bluff Harbour Board and Bluff Borough Council Empowering Act  Amended: 1934/39
 Canterbury University College Act  Amended: 1953/56
 Card Tournaments Regulation Act 
 Co-operative Pig-marketing Companies Act 
 Coinage Act 
 Greymouth Borough Relief of Unemployment Loan Validation Act 
 New Plymouth Airport Act 
 New Plymouth Borough Council and New Plymouth Harbour Board Empowering Act  Amended: 1948
 New Zealand Branch of the British Red Cross and Order of St John Empowering Act 
 Poor Prisoners' Defence Act 
 Poultry-runs Registration Act 
 Reserve Bank of New Zealand Act  Amended: 1936/39/50/58/60/64/67/68/70/71/73/74/75/77/80/82/86/88/90/92/93/95/99/2003/06/07
 Royal Society of New Zealand Act  Amended: 1964
 Victoria University College Act  Amended: 1947
 Whakatane Harbour Board Vesting Act 
Plus 29 Acts amended

1934  

 Agricultural Emergency Regulations Confirmation Act 
 Board of Native Affairs Act 
 Christchurch City Empowering Act  Repealed: 1948
 Greymouth United Borough Rating Empowering Act 
 Maori Purposes Fund Act  Amended: 2001
 Mortgage Corporation of New Zealand Act  Amended: 1935
 Native Plants Protection Act 
 New Plymouth Borough Land Exchange and Empowering Act 
 Oamaru Harbour Board Empowering Act 
 Passports Act  Amended: 1987/91/94/2002/03/05
 Poisons Act  Amended: 1952/62/64/67/69
 Reciprocal Enforcement of Judgments Act  Amended: 1990/92
 Rural Mortgagors Final Adjustment Act  Amended: 1935
 Stock-remedies Act  Amended: 1946/47
 Te Ore Ore River Board Rating Act 
 Trustee Companies Protection Act 
 Wairau River Board Empowering Act 
Plus 31 Acts amended

1935  

 Colonial Light Dues Act 
 District Grand Lodge of English Freemasons of Auckland Trustees Act 
 Dunedin City Empowering Act 
 Featherston County Water-race Districts Validation Act 
 Hamilton Borough Council Empowering Act  Amended: 1937
 Hauraki Plains County Eastern Water-supply Empowering Act 
 Housing Survey Act 
 Napier Airport Act  Amended: 1938
 Napier Foreshore Extension Act 
 Native Housing Act  Amended: 1938
 Nelson Waterworks Extension Act  Amended: 1936
 The New Zealand Institute for the Blind Rating Exemption Act 
 Tobacco-growing Industry Act 
 War Veterans' Allowances Act 
 Whaling Industry Act  Amended: 1974
 Will's Road Hall Act 
Plus 27 Acts amended

See also 
The above list may not be current and will contain errors and omissions. For more accurate information try:
 Walter Monro Wilson, The Practical Statutes of New Zealand, Auckland: Wayte and Batger 1867
 The Knowledge Basket: Legislation NZ
 New Zealand Legislation Includes some Imperial and Provincial Acts. Only includes Acts currently in force, and as amended.
 Legislation Direct List of statutes from 2003 to order

Lists of statutes of New Zealand